Mary Beth Dunnichay (born February 25, 1993 in Elwood, Indiana) is an American platform diver. Her older brother Caleb is also a competitive diver for Auburn University.

She was named to the 2008 U.S. Olympic team in both the 10-meter platform and the synchronized 10-meter platform event with Haley Ishimatsu. In the synchronized competition Ishimatsu and Dunnichay earned fifth place scoring 309.12.

In May 2012, the city of Elwood, Indiana, Dunnichay's hometown, renamed their city pool Mary Beth Dunnichay Aquatic Center.

References

External links
 
 
 

1993 births
Living people
Sportspeople from Indianapolis
Olympic divers of the United States
Divers at the 2007 Pan American Games
Divers at the 2008 Summer Olympics
American female divers
People from Elwood, Indiana
World Aquatics Championships medalists in diving
Pan American Games medalists in diving
Pan American Games bronze medalists for the United States
Medalists at the 2007 Pan American Games